Zhu Daqing (born 25 February 1990) is a visually impaired Paralympian athlete from China competing mainly in T12 classification sprint events. Zhu won a bronze medal at her first Summer Paralympics, the 2012 London Games, in the women's 200m sprint. She is also a World Championships and Asia-Oceania Games medalists, winning six medals over three tournaments.

Notes

1990 births
Chinese female sprinters
Paralympic athletes of China
Athletes (track and field) at the 2012 Summer Paralympics
Paralympic bronze medalists for China
Living people
Medalists at the 2012 Summer Paralympics
Sportspeople from Baoding
Runners from Hebei
Paralympic medalists in athletics (track and field)
21st-century Chinese women